Nadeau may refer to:

People 
 Brianne Nadeau (born 1980), City Council member, Ward One, District of Columbia
 Jerry Nadeau (born 1970), American race car driver
Louise Nadeau (born 1947), Canadian psychologist
 Remi Nadeau (1920–2016), American historian
 Richard Nadeau (born 1959), Canadian teacher and Bloc Québécois politician in Quebec
 Robert Nadeau (aikidoka) (born 1937), American aikido teacher
 Robert Nadeau (science historian) (born 1944), American environmental scientist and science historian
 Luann de Lesseps (née Nadeau, born 1965), American celebrity

Places 
 Nadeau Township, Michigan